The 2000 Southern Conference baseball tournament was held at Joseph P. Riley Jr. Park in Charleston, South Carolina, from May 17 through 21. Top seeded  won the tournament and earned the Southern Conference's automatic bid to the 2000 NCAA Division I baseball tournament. It was the Eagles second tournament win.

The tournament used a double-elimination format. Only the top eight teams participate, so VMI, Western Carolina, and Wofford were not in the field. Western Carolina earned the top seed by winning the season series over regular season co-champion The Citadel. College of Charleston earned the seventh seed by winning the season series over Davidson.

Seeding

Bracket 

* - Indicates game required extra innings.

All-Tournament Team

References 

Tournament
Southern Conference Baseball Tournament
Southern Conference baseball tournament
Southern Conference baseball tournament